The Samsung Galaxy Watch is a smartwatch developed by Samsung Electronics. It was announced on 9 August 2018. The Galaxy Watch was scheduled for availability in the United States starting on 24 August 2018, at select carriers and retail locations in South Korea on 31 August 2018, and in additional select markets on 14 September 2018.

On 27 February 2021, Shortly after the Galaxy Watch Active2 and Galaxy Watch3 received an update unlocking the ECG feature for the European countries, Samsung is now delivering Galaxy Watch3-intrinsic features to the original Galaxy Watch and Watch Active.

Specifications

References

External links 
Galaxy Watch on Samsung Newsroom

Consumer electronics brands
Products introduced in 2018
Smartwatches
Samsung wearable devices